The 2012–13 Campionato Sammarinese di Calcio season was the twenty-eighth since its establishment. The league is the uppermost in San Marino, in which the country's top 15 amateur football clubs play. The season began on 14 September 2012 and ended with the play-off final in May 2013. Tre Penne are the defending league champions, having won their first ever Sammarinese championship last season. Tre Penne retained their title, defeating ten-man AC Libertas 5–3 on penalties in a repeat of the previous year's play-off final.

Participating teams

Because there is no promotion or relegation in the league, the same 15 teams who competed in the league last season will compete in the league this season. 
 S.P. Cailungo (Borgo Maggiore)
 S.S. Cosmos (Serravalle)
 F.C. Domagnano (Domagnano)
 S.C. Faetano (Faetano)
 S.S. Folgore/Falciano (Serravalle)
 F.C. Fiorentino (Fiorentino)
 A.C. Juvenes/Dogana (Serravalle)
 S.P. La Fiorita (Montegiardino)
 A.C. Libertas (Borgo Maggiore)
 S.S. Murata (San Marino)
 S.S. Pennarossa (Chiesanuova)
 S.S. San Giovanni (Borgo Maggiore)
 S.P. Tre Fiori (Fiorentino)
 S.P. Tre Penne (Serravalle)
 S.S. Virtus (Acquaviva)

Venues
The teams do not have grounds of their own due to restricted space in San Marino. Each match was randomly assigned to one of the following grounds:
 Stadio Olimpico (Serravalle)
 Campo di Fiorentino (Fiorentino)
 Campo di Acquaviva (Chiesanuova)
 Campo di Dogana (Serravalle)
 Campo Fonte dell'Ovo (Domagnano)
 Campo di Serravalle "B" (Serravalle)

Regular season
The 15 clubs are split into two groups; one with eight clubs and another with seven clubs.

Group A

Group B

Results
All teams will play twice against the teams within their own group and once against the teams from the other group. This means that the clubs in the eight-club group will play 21 matches each while the clubs in the seven-club group will play 20 matches each during the regular season.

Season statistics

Top scorers

Play-off
The play-off was held in a double-eliminination format. Both group winners (Libertas and Folgore) earned byes in the first and second round.

First round

Second round

Cosmos is eliminated

Third round

Murata is eliminated

Fourth round

Folgore is eliminated

Fifth round

La Fiorita is eliminated

Final

References 

Campionato Sammarinese di Calcio
San Marino
1